This is a List of FIM Road Racing World Championship Grand Prix broadcasters. MotoGP, the highest level of motorcycle road racing sanctioned by the Fédération Internationale de Motocyclisme, motor sport's world governing body, can be seen live or tape delayed on television in almost every country and territory around the world.

TV broadcasters all take what is known as the 'World Feed', which since 1992 has been produced by Dorna Sports. Every race is produced in 16:9 widescreen.

Dorna produces LiveTV coverage from all Grand Prix in-house.

The Live International Programme Feed (IPF) is produced in High Definition Dolby 5.1 using more than 100 High Definition cameras at each GP, including fixed cameras, on-board cameras, a Helicam and RF cameras. Dorna is refining the use of its Super Slow Motion images captured from a Super High Speed SloMo camera.

The worldwide TV coverage also includes Dorna's MotoGP Multiscreen offering, which streams signals from varying cameras on- and around the track, including on-board footage during sessions. These feeds bring new camera angles to audiences. Using internet platforms, mobile apps, as well as adding this to their TV coverage are Sky Italia, BT Sport and others.

Broadcasters 
These are the broadcasters for the 2023 MotoGP World Championship.

 – Rights in Brunei, Cambodia, Hong Kong, Indonesia, Laos, Macau, Malaysia, Mongolia, Myanmar, Philippines, Singapore and Thailand

References 

Broadcasters
MotoGP